The summer of 2012–13, had above average fire potential for most of the southern half of the continent from the east coast to the west. This is despite having extensive fire in parts of the country over the last 12 months. The reason for this prediction is the abundant grass growth spurred by two La Niña events over the last two years.

Most parts of the country experienced a heat wave at the start of 2013, with a new national average maximum being set on 7 January 2013. The new record of  beat the old record of  that had been set on 21 December 1972.

Additionally, six of the 20 hottest days in Australian records (by average maximum) have been in January 2013.

Australia also experienced its hottest summer on average following a particularly hot spell in January. Using average day and night temperatures the average was found to be  beating the previous record set in the summer of 1997–1988. The daytime maximum temperatures for 2012–13 also beat the 1982–83 record and January was the hottest month since records began in 1910.

Fires of note

Fires by state or territory

New South Wales 

Catastrophic fire danger ratings were observed in the Bombala, Condobolin, Hay, Nowra and Wagga Wagga fire regions on 8 January and in Coonamble on 13 January.

December

January

During the first week of January, several dozen fires were ignited across southern regions of the state by lightning strikes; the Greater Hume, Hilltops, Snowy Monaro, Snowy Valleys, Wagga Wagga local government areas were affected.

On 6 January, a fire was reported to have ignited along Mount Forrest Rd., Cooma, following lightning activity in the region.

On 7 January, a fast moving grass fire ignited near the village of Oura. 140 volunteers from the RFS, six aircraft—including an Erickson Air-Crane—and four heavy plant equipment were used to try to contain the fire. Approximately  of scrub, forest and pasture were burned, one vehicle was destroyed and a firefighter suffered minor injuries after being over-run by the fire in a firefighting tanker.

The observatory was impacted by the fire in the late afternoon, causing the destruction of three buildings in the complex; 'The Lodge' accommodation used by visiting researchers, the Director's Cottage and the Fire Station.

Northern Territory

Queensland

South Australia

November

On 11 November, a fire ignited on private property west of Sleaford Mere, near Port Lincoln. The fire ultimately burned  of scrub, grassland and pasture and impacted the community of Tulka; 14 cabins on the foreshore at Sleaford Mere, 2 homes, a caravan, a campervan, several sheds and four other vehicles were destroyed and 300 head of livestock died.

January

During the afternoon, the fire was brought under control by 60 firefighters, supported by firefighting aircraft. Approximately  of crops, farmland and vineyards were burned by the fire and a  portion of rail tracks for the Steam Ranger was destroyed.

May

On 9 May, a private burn-off north of Cherryville in the Adelaide Hills escaped the landowner's control and burnt east into inaccessible countryside. More than 250 Country Fire Service volunteers and four aerial water bombers took three days to contain the fire, assisted by rain on the evening of the third day. The fire burned at least  of scrub and pasture and impacted the community of Cherryville; one house and two sheds were destroyed and two firefighters were treated for minor injuries. The fire was notable in that it occurred outside the fire-ban season, leading to calls that the season should be extended.

Tasmania

Victoria 

January

At least 360 CFA and 42 DSE personnel, supported by 6 firefighting aircraft and 3 bulldozers, fought to contain the fire and 400 residents and visitors were evacuated from Carngham and Burrumbeet caravan park. During a  run from the point of ignition, the fire burned  of scrub, grassland and pasture and impacted upon the communities of Burrumbeet, Carngham, Chepstowe and Snake Valley; The historic 120-year-old Carngham Station and 8 other houses, 12 cars and tractors, a number of sheds, and vineyards at Chepstowe Vineyard were destroyed and 800 head of livestock died. At least 6 people required medical attention as a result of the fire, 2 for minor burns and 4 for smoke inhalation.

On 17 January, a fire ignited in bushland in the Donnelly Creek Rd. area, near Aberfeldy. As the fire spread to the east, 61 children and 15 adults were evacuated from the Licola Wilderness Village, while 10 residents and about 30 firefighters remained in Licola. Unusually for a fire in Australia, a significant spread occurred at night and by the following day the fire had covered , with spot fires starting to the south-east and impacting the communities of Coongulla, Glenmaggie, Heyfield, Newry and Seaton, causing destruction. On 18 January, it was announced the body of a man had been found in a burnt out vehicle in Seaton. The fire was the largest in the state since the Black Saturday fires of 2009 and required significant commitment from firefighting authorities to control; 760 firefighting personnel from the CFA and DSE in 180 firefighting appliances and 23 bulldozers, supported by 13 firefighting aircraft, attended to the blaze over its 43-day duration. The fire burned  of forest, scrub and grassland—much within the Baw Baw National Park—and impacted upon the communities of Coongulla, Dawson, Glenmaggie, Heyfield, Licola, Newry and Seaton; 21 houses, 17 vehicles, a number of sheds and caravans were destroyed.

On 21 January, lightning ignited a fire in the vicinity of Mt. Feathertop, near Harrietville and within the Alpine National Park. On 27 February, the fire was declared contained after burning  of public and private land during a 55-day period.

February

Several of these fires would merge on 18 February, creating a  fire complex and threatening properties in the Mirranatwa community. By 21 February, the Victoria Valley Complex fire had burned  and threatened the areas Woohlpooer and Mooralla. 300 firefighters, supported by 14 aircraft, attended to the blaze. On 27 February the fire was declared contained, after burning through  and destroying 3 sheds, 130 kilometres of fencing,  of hardwood forest and 30 tonnes of hay and causing the deaths of 60 head of livestock.

On 18 February, a fire ignited in grass along Donnybrook Rd., Donnybrook, and quickly spread to impact upon the Hume Freeway, disrupting traffic. Several hundred firefighters in approximately 80 appliances and supported by 6 firefighting aircraft were required to bring the fire under control by the following morning. During the fire,  of scrub, grassland and pasture were burned and the communities of Donnybrook and Epping were impacted; several sheds, 7 vehicles and 3,000 hay bales were destroyed and one house damaged.

March

On 27 March, a suspicious fire ignited in dense scrub along Ferrers Rd., Dereel, and spread rapidly, spotting up to  ahead of the main fire front. During the following hours,  of scrub, grassland and pasture were burned and fire impacted on property in and around the communities of Corindhap, Dereel and Mount Mercer; 16 houses and 15 sheds were destroyed within a few hours. Several hundred firefighters in at least 50 firefighting appliances attended the blaze and 4 firefighters required hospital treatment for minor burns and smoke inhalation.

Western Australia 

---

August

Northern Territory
A bushfire burnt out a large area of pasture at Newcastle Waters Station on 20 August when a car caught fire on the Stuart Highway, the fire to the east of the highway was extinguished but the area to the west was controlled by station workers to keep it away from stock. The fire eventually came to Lake Longreach within the station where it burnt out in the damp conditions.

September

Queensland
Fire crews battled blazes on the Atherton Tableland to keep a bushfire behind containment lines near Millstream on 24 September, the fires were thought to be started by arsonists.

New South Wales
Fire broke out in the Awabakal Nature reserve between Dudley and Redhead 24 September. During the course of the day the fire consumed  of bushland and was brought under control the following day following rain in the area.

Northern Territory

Western Australia
In 2012 a fire was burning for three days near Madura Station covering the Eyre Highway in smoke. Over  of bushland was consumed by the blaze.

October

Queensland
Graziers were left with very little feed left for 50,000–60,000 head of cattle in the area and the historic Croydon -Esmeralda Homestead that dated back to the 1800s was also burnt to the ground.

New South Wales
Five bushfires were burning simultaneously in the Singleton area in late October including one in the Pokolbin State forest.

Northern Territory
Dry storms caused the outbreak of hundreds of fires in the border region of the Northern Territory and Western Australia over a week between 14 and 23 October. Many of the fires were left to burn in areas that were inaccessible and high winds made containment too difficult. Surrounding stations Angus downs and King's Creek lost similar amounts.

Western Australia
A bush fire broke out on private land near Two Peoples Bay on 12 October and a team of about 20 fire-fighters arrived to combat the blaze. Following a sudden change in wind direction a track carrying two of the fire crew was engulfed in flames. The two women, both females, received terrible burns. The 45-year-old woman received burns to 60% of her body was admitted to hospital in critical condition and the 24-year-old had burns to 40% of her body and was also critical but stable. Both women were transferred from Albany via the Royal Flying Doctor Service to Perth. The older woman, Wendy Bearfoot, died in Royal Perth Hospital 1 November as a result of her injuries, a WorkSafe investigation was launched to investigate the circumstances.

November

New South Wales
Properties were threatened by a bushfire at Lake Macquarie on 1 November. The fire burnt out over
 of bushland and was eventually contained by 120 members of the Rural Fire Service the following day.

Two fires broke out in the Upper Hunter Region on 25 November. The first fire was burning in the Wollemi National Park and the second near Bunnan had burned out . Both were under control on 26 November.

Northern Territory
Two large fires resulted in large areas of bushland being burnt. Both fires were monitored and some back burning was done in an effort to control the blazes.

South Australia
Seven houses were lost along with sheds and vehicles on 11 November in a fire that swept through  of land at Tulka near Port Lincoln.
Lightning strikes caused over 100 fires to ignite around the state on 20 November. Fires on the Eyre peninsula were the most difficult with one fire advancing to within  of Port Lincoln. A number of residents evacuated their homes after  of bush was lost despite the efforts of 120 fire-fighters and five waterbombers used to combat the blaze.
The following day a further 31,591 lightning strikes initiated a further 300 fires, 600 volunteers worked overnight to extinguish the majority of fires.

Tasmania
Several fires erupted in late November, including a major fire at Forcett, in which 11 firefighters were evacuated with injuries after a wind change. There were other fires, such as the one at Glenlusk on the outskirts of Hobart and another major fire at Poatina in the Central Lakes district. The fire at Forcett was rapidly brought under control, while the one at Glenlusk posed serious danger to houses and farms (and actually destroyed several vehicles and shacks). The fire at Poatina Road in the Central Lakes District was burning out of control two weeks later and was only brought under control in the middle of January.

Victoria
A huge blaze broke out near Casterton on 21 November and quickly burnt out over  bushland. Fire crews employed back burns to create control lines around the fire, which was extinguished a few days later.

December

Queensland
A fire broke out on North Stradbroke Island, off Brisbane on 8 December. By 10 December several properties had been lost to the fire at Myora Springs. Several other fires were burning around the state including two west of Brisbane and another near Ipswich.

New South Wales

South Australia

Victoria
This was one of 35 fires that started 23 and 24 December around the state.

January

Northern Territory
During the course of a heat wave several fires broke out in the Northern Territory. One fire that originated in the Watarrka National Park spread into the Kings Canyon resort on 8 January causing damage and leading to the evacuation of 120 staff and guests. A second fire at Napperby station had burnt through  with  flames jumping containment lines.

Tasmania

Several large bushfires started on the afternoon of 3 January, including blazes at Lake Repulse, Richmond and Inala Rd, Forcett. The bushfires in both the Forcett and Lake Repulse areas both rapidly burned out over 1,000 hectares of land, burning in an easterly direction as a result of the prevailing Westerly wind, which pushed the Forcett Fire parallel to the Arthur Highway. It was attacked front on by Tasmania Fire Service crews and stopped just short of Copping in the evening of 3 January. A Northerly wind change on 4 January caused the fire to jump the Arthur Highway by 3pm on 4 January and spread south towards Primrose Sands and Dunalley. At least one hundred buildings, including 10 in Copping and 65 in Dunalley were destroyed.
The fire spread towards the Forestier and Tasman Peninsulas, threatening the townships of Murdunna and Eaglehawk Neck.

Meanwhile, another major fire burned to the north of Hobart at Lake Repulse, threatening the communities of Elendale, Ouse and Meadowbank, it was also expected that the communities of Hamilton and Lawrenny would be impacted by 6am on the morning of 6 January.

South Australia
Temperatures soared to  near Finniss, south of Adelaide, shortly before a bushfire broke out on 4 January. About  of crops, farmland and vineyards were destroyed by the fire along with a portion of rail tracks for the Steam Ranger until it was brought under control by 60 fire fighters and waterbombers.

Victoria
A fire broke out in Kentbruck in the southwest of the state on 4 January. It had covered  by 8 January, posing a threat to the nearby communities of Drik Drik and Dartmoor. On 8 January a  fire to the west of Ballarat swept through the localities of Snake Valley, Chepstowe and Carngham destroying nine homes including the historic homestead Carngham Station.

On 17 January a fire began in bushland in the Donnelly Creek Road area near Aberfeldy. As the fire spread to the east, 61 children and 15 adults were evacuated from the Licola Wilderness Village, while 10 residents and about 30 firefighters remained in Licola. By the following day the fire had covered , with spot fires starting to the south-east at Coongulla, Glenmaggie, Heyfield, Newry and Seaton. 22 houses were destroyed as well as a number of dwellings at Glenmaggie Caravan Park. On 18 January, it was announced the body of a man was found in his burnt out vehicle in Seaton.

Western Australia
A fire broke out in the Shire of Gingin near Lennard Brooke on 26 January and raged out of control overnight while burning through  of bushland. Over 50 firefighters were required to save homes and sheds from the blaze and had the blaze under control the following day. Bushfires were also burning around Busselton which were thought to have been deliberately lit, following the outbreak of about 25 fires over the course of the month. Another fire was accidentally started by the exhaust of a quad-bike being used to spray weeds by a contractor on 29 January at the Benger Swamp reserve south of Harvey. Over  of scrub was burned before it was brought under control.

A bushfire near Carnarvon was burning on the north eastern side of town on 28 January. The fire burnt out of control with strong winds starting spot fires among the banana plantations. The blaze was controlled a day later but not before  of bushland destroying 20 derelict buildings and sheds, but leaving the plantations with only minor damage.

February

Tasmania
On 10 February 13 bushfires were burning across the state.

Victoria
On 8 February a bushfire fanned by strong winds came within  of homes near Mount Hotham.

On 13 February, two fire fighters from the Department of Sustainability and Environment were killed after a tree fell on a vehicle they were in, while fighting the Harrietville fire, which has burnt  of bushland. The fire ended up burning for 55 days in total and destroyed  of public and private land.

A large fire started in Donnybrook on 18 February.

Western Australia
A bushfire broke out under suspicious circumstances in the outer suburb of Pink Lake in Esperance on 4 February. 50 firefighters and two fixed wing waterbombers were required to contain the blaze.

Another fire broke on 5 February out near Boddington and burnt out of control destroying a cottage.

Fires broke out south east of Byford on the South Western Highway in Whitby on 12 February. An emergency warning was issued as the fire headed toward the Darling Range through thick forest with a scattering of houses.

Another fire started 13 February near the Blackwood River near Southampton and then burnt out of control through the surrounding forest before destroying two homes, including the historic Southampton Homestead, and  near Bridgetown.

More fires broke out 15 February including one north of Australind near Leschenault that threatened homes and properties. Another further south near Kin Kin which had started earlier in the week from lightning strikes had burnt through  of bushland. Human remains were found in a shack in Kin Kin on 15 February.

Lightning started a fire near Bindoon on 21 February and quickly burnt through  of bushland pushed by strong winds and threatening nearby homes. The blaze was brought under control the following day when favourable weather conditions prevailed.

The man was hit by a falling branch and was taken to hospital where he was pronounced as dead on arrival.

Fires threatened homes in Upper Swan on 26 February before being brought under control by over 70 fire-fighters. Residents were evacuated as the blaze consumed  of bushland.

More fires started on 28 February at Shady Hills in Bullsbrook and the western end of Walyunga National Park.

March

Victoria
On 27 March, a bushfire at Dereel, south of Ballarat destroyed 16 houses and 18 sheds. Four firefighters required hospital treatment for minor burns and smoke inhalation. The fire, which covered , was brought under control in the evening.

May

South Australia
On 9 May, a private burn-off north of Cherryville in the Adelaide Hills escaped the landowner's control and burnt east into inaccessible countryside. More than 250 Country Fire Service volunteers and four aerial water bombers took three days to contain the fire, assisted by rain on the evening of the third day. One house and two sheds were destroyed, with the fire burning  of scrub and farmland. Two firefighters were treated for minor injuries. The fire was notable in that it occurred outside the fire-ban season, leading to calls that the season should be extended.

References 

2012
2012 wildfires
2013 wildfires
Bushfire
Bushfire
Bush
Bush